Pushkinskoye is a rural locality (a village) in Kaltymanovsky Selsoviet, Iglinsky District, Bashkortostan, Russia. The population was 202 as of 2010. There are 4 streets.

Geography 
Pushkinskoye is located 24 km southeast of Iglino (the district's administrative centre) by road. Kalininskoye is the nearest rural locality.

References 

Rural localities in Iglinsky District